Acridine carboxamide is a chemotherapy agent that is being studied in the treatment of cancer. It belongs to the family of drugs called topoisomerase inhibitors.

While the agent was well tolerated in Phase II clinical trials, it did not show efficacy when tested against various types of cancers.

See also 
 Ondansetron, an isomer of Acridine carboxamide

References 

Experimental cancer drugs
Topoisomerase inhibitors
Acridines